The Nauset people, sometimes referred to as the Cape Cod Indians, were a Native American tribe who lived in Cape Cod, Massachusetts. They lived east of Bass River and lands occupied by their closely-related neighbors, the Wampanoag.

Although the Nauset were a distinct tribe, they were often subject to Wampanoag rule and shared with them many similar aspects of culture, agricultural practices, and a common tongue, the Massachusett language. Living along the Atlantic Ocean, the Nauset relied heavily on seafood.

The tribe was one of the first to be visited by European explorers and colonists, who abducted some tribal members to sell into slavery in Spain and introduced diseases which reduced the Nauset population even before colonization of New England began on a large scale.

The Pilgrims' first contact with the Nauset was during the Mayflower's landing near present-day Provincetown, when they discovered a deserted village, the Nauset being away at their winter hunting grounds. Desperately low on supplies, the Pilgrims helped themselves to a cache of maize, though they left a note (in English) promising to pay for what they had stolen. The promise was eventually kept when the Nauset, led by Aspinet, returned months later. The Nauset also returned a small boy who had wandered away from the colony and become lost, an act which greatly improved relations with nearby colonists.

In subsequent years, the Nauset became the colonists' closest allies. Most became Christianized and aided the colonists as scouts and warriors against the Wampanoag during King Philip's War. Their numbers, always small, were further reduced. They intermarried with neighboring tribes and settlers after King Philip's War.

Legacy 
 Nauset Regional High School is located in North Eastham, within the boundaries of the Cape Cod National Seashore, and serves students from Brewster, Orleans, Eastham, Wellfleet, Truro and surrounding towns.
 Nauset Regional Middle School is located in Orleans, and serves students from the same towns as the high school.
 Nauset Light Beach, North Eastham
 Nauset Beach, Orleans

See also 
 Native American tribes in Massachusetts

References

External links 
 Nauset History

Algonquian ethnonyms
Algonquian peoples
Eastham, Massachusetts
Native American tribes in Massachusetts
Wampanoag